Suzanne Crouch (born February 27, 1952) is an American politician who has served as the 52nd lieutenant governor of Indiana since 2017. She previously served as the 56th state auditor of Indiana. She is running for governor of Indiana in 2024.

A member of the Republican Party, Crouch served in the Indiana House of Representatives from 2005 to 2014. On December 15, 2013, Governor Mike Pence appointed her to serve as the 56th State Auditor of Indiana. Crouch was reelected to that position in 2014. She resigned as State Auditor following her election as Lieutenant Governor of Indiana in 2016.

Early life
Crouch graduated from Mater Dei High School in Evansville and received her Bachelor of Science degree from Purdue University, majoring in political science. Before serving in local government, Crouch chaired the Vanderburgh County Republican Central Committee for four years. Under her chairship, a majority of Republicans were elected to County Council, the first time in 60 years that Republicans controlled that body.

County government

County Auditor
Crouch was elected Vanderburgh County Auditor in 1994 and served two terms.

Vanderburgh County Commissioner
In 2002, Crouch was elected to the Vanderburgh County Board of Commissioners and served as president until the end of her term in 2005. She worked to televise weekly commission meetings and by holding public hearings to seek the public's input on important issues. While she was president, the Commissioners, for the first time ever, applied and received federal transportation dollars for a local road project.

Indiana State Representative
In 2005 the district 78 seat for state representative was vacated by Vaneta Becker, who had moved to the State Senate to fill the vacated seat of Greg Server. House District 78 contains parts of Spencer, Vanderburgh and Warrick counties. Parts of Evansville, Newburgh, Richland, Hatfield, Darmstadt and McCutchanville are in the district. Crouch was elected to fill the position in a caucus by precinct committeemen. She was appointed vice chair of the Public Health Committee in the state legislature. Crouch was challenged in the 2006 Republican primary by conservative activist Jonathan Fulton but defeated him with 63% of the vote.

Indiana State Auditor
After Indiana State Auditor Dwayne Sawyer resigned in 2013, Crouch was appointed to fill the position. In 2014, after the completion of Sawyer's term, the Republican Party of Indiana officially nominated Crouch for that year's election. On November 4, Crouch was elected by 23 points over Democratic nominee Mike Claytor, with 59.6% of the vote.

Lieutenant governor

2016 election
After Governor Mike Pence was named Donald Trump's running mate in the 2016 presidential election, he had to withdraw from the gubernatorial election. Eric Holcomb, the lieutenant governor of Indiana, was chosen as Republican nominee for governor, and Crouch as the nominee for lieutenant governor.

Electoral history

See also
List of female lieutenant governors in the United States

References

External links

|-

|-

|-

1952 births
21st-century American politicians
21st-century American women politicians
Indiana State Auditors
Lieutenant Governors of Indiana
Living people
Republican Party members of the Indiana House of Representatives
Purdue University alumni
Politicians from Evansville, Indiana
Women state legislators in Indiana
Candidates in the 2024 United States elections